Manly Corner is a locality where the Yellowhead Highway (Highway 16) intersects Highway 43 in Parkland County, Alberta. It is named after the nearby former locality of Manly, located northeast of the junction. An Alberta Heritage marker describes this Highway as leading to Dawson Creek, British Columbia, where the Alaska Highway begins, and signifies where the CANAMEX Corridor transitions from Highway 16 to Highway 43.

References 

Localities in Parkland County